The adjective kaiserlich means "imperial" and was used in the German-speaking countries to refer to those institutions and establishments over which the Kaiser ("emperor") had immediate personal power of control.

The term was used particularly in connexion  with the Roman-German Emperor as sovereign of the Holy Roman Empire and with the subsequent Empire of Austria. In the Early Modern Period the term is linked with the universal precedence of the Kaiser over the other princes of the realm. Holders of an imperial or kaiserliche office were recruited from the whole empire, and had wide-ranging privileges in the territories.

Examples of military, political and cultural institutions with kaiserliche players in the Holy Roman Empire are the:

 Kaiserliche Armee (Imperial Army) and 
 Kaiserliche Reichspost (Imperial Post Office)
of the Roman-German Emperor (to 1806) (Habsburg, only 1742–1745 Wittelsbach)
 kaiserliches Hofgestüt (Imperial Stud) at Lipizza (1779), home of the Lipizzaners;
 kaiserliche Hofburg (Hofburg Palace) in Vienna;
 kaiserliches Hofmobiliendepot (Imperial Furniture Museum) in Vienna ;
 kaiserliche Residenz ("imperial residence") of Schönbrunn at Vienna;
 kaiserliche Hofmusikkapelle (Imperial Court Band)

The traditions continued in the Holy Roman Empire's successors, the Empire of Austria and in Austria-Hungary (with the suffix königlich or "royal"). The kaiserliche soldiers had an especially romanticised calling and loyalty, and occasionally similar names continue to the present day e. g. in several musical pieces and the Kaiserjäger band. 

In Switzerland the term has negative connotations that go back to the protracted struggle for independence of the Swiss Confederation.

The term was not used in the German Empire of the 19th century, with the exception of the Imperial German Navy (Kaiserliche Marine).

Its use in the Napoleonic Wars and in connexion with the Battle of the Three Emperors is problematic.

See also 
 kaiserlich und königlich
 kaiserlich-königlich
 Kaiserliche Armee (disambiguation)

Monarchy of the Holy Roman Empire
Austria-Hungary
German words and phrases